Rudi Strittich (3 March 1922 – 11 July 2010) was an Austrian football coach and former player.

Club career
Strittich debuted for Vorwärts Steyr, and later played for First Vienna FC. While with First Vienna, he went on a tour of the Middle East and upon returning was arrested along with two other players for smuggling narcotics into Austria. Strittich was imprisoned for three months and banned from football for one year by the Austrian Football Association.

Unable to play football in Austria, Strittich was recruited by Béla Guttmann to play for Italian club USC Triestina. The Austrian FA would not clear him to play, so he joined Colombian side Samarios, where he could play because the Colombian Football Federation was not at the time affiliated to FIFA.

Upon returning to Austria, Strittich learned that his ban was still in effect, as the Austrian FA ruled that he did serve the ban while playing in Colombia. He moved to Switzerland and trained with the youth side of Young Fellows Zürich. Next, he briefly returned to Vienna, and was sold to French side Besançon RC after just six months. He suffered a back injury in France, and would retire from playing soon after.

International career
He made his debut for Austria in December 1946 against Hungary and earned 4 caps, scoring one goal.

Coaching career
After retiring as a football player Strittich worked as a coach for Sturm Graz in his home country. However, his greatest success as a coach came in Denmark, where he made Esbjerg fB champions in 1961, 1962, 1965, and 1979. He was also coach of the Denmark national football team from 1970 to 1975.

Honours

As a player
 Austrian Football Bundesliga (1): 1943

As a manager
 Danish Football League (4): 1961, 1962, 1965, 1979

References

External links
 
 

1922 births
2010 deaths
Association football midfielders
Austrian footballers
Austria international footballers
SK Vorwärts Steyr players
First Vienna FC players
Racing Besançon players
Expatriate footballers in Colombia
Expatriate footballers in Italy
Expatriate footballers in France
Austrian football managers
Austrian expatriate football managers
SK Sturm Graz managers
Esbjerg fB managers
SK Vorwärts Steyr managers
Viborg FF managers
FC Red Bull Salzburg managers
FC Basel managers
Real Murcia managers
Denmark national football team managers
Expatriate football managers in Denmark
Expatriate football managers in Greece
Expatriate football managers in Spain
Expatriate football managers in Switzerland
Austrian expatriate sportspeople in Colombia
Austrian expatriate sportspeople in Denmark
Austrian expatriate sportspeople in France
Austrian expatriate sportspeople in Greece
Austrian expatriate sportspeople in Italy
Austrian expatriate sportspeople in Spain
Austrian expatriate sportspeople in Switzerland
AaB Fodbold managers
Unión Magdalena footballers